Under the old Model-year nomenclature system many different pieces of equipment had the same Model number.

 16-inch howitzer M1920
 14-inch M1920 railway gun
 4.7 inch Gun M1920 on Carriage M1920

See also
 M1918 (disambiguation)